In enzymology, a 4-hydroxyphenylpyruvate oxidase is an enzyme that catalyzes the chemical reaction

4-hydroxyphenylpyruvate + 1/2 O2  4-hydroxyphenylacetate + CO2

Thus, the two substrates of this enzyme are 4-hydroxyphenylpyruvate and O2, whereas its two products are 4-hydroxyphenylacetate and CO2.

This enzyme belongs to the family of oxidoreductases, specifically those acting on the aldehyde or oxo group of donor with oxygen as acceptor.  The systematic name of this enzyme class is 4-hydroxyphenylpyruvate:oxygen oxidoreductase (decarboxylating). This enzyme participates in tyrosine metabolism.

References 

 

EC 1.2.3
Enzymes of unknown structure